Heather Diantha Jan Siegers (born 10 October 1996) is a Dutch cricketer, who is the current captain of the Netherlands women's national cricket team.

Career
She played for the Netherlands women's national cricket team in the 2015 ICC Women's World Twenty20 Qualifier in November 2015.

In June 2018, she was named as the captain of the Netherlands for the 2018 ICC Women's World Twenty20 Qualifier tournament. Ahead of the tournament, the International Cricket Council (ICC) named her as the player to watch in the Dutch squad. She made her Women's Twenty20 International (WT20I) for the Netherlands against United Arab Emirates in the World Twenty20 Qualifier on 7 July 2018. In July 2018, she was named in the ICC Women's Global Development Squad.

In May 2019, she was named in Netherlands' squad for the 2019 ICC Women's Qualifier Europe tournament in Spain. She was the leading wicket-taker in the tournament, with seven dismissals in four matches. In August 2019, she was named in the Dutch squad for the 2019 ICC Women's World Twenty20 Qualifier tournament in Scotland. She was the leading wicket-taker for the Netherlands in the tournament, with eight dismissals in five matches.

In October 2021, she was named as the captain of the Dutch team for the 2021 Women's Cricket World Cup Qualifier tournament in Zimbabwe.

References

External links
 
 

1996 births
Living people
Sportspeople from Haarlem
Dutch women cricketers
Netherlands women Twenty20 International cricketers
Dutch women cricket captains
Worcestershire women cricketers
20th-century Dutch women
20th-century Dutch people
21st-century Dutch women